Rothia is a genus of moths of the family Noctuidae.

Species
 Rothia agrius 
 Rothia arrosa
 Rothia caecata
 Rothia cruenta
 Rothia dayremi
 Rothia distigma
 Rothia divisa
 Rothia epiera
 Rothia epipales
 Rothia fianarantsoa
 Rothia hampsoni
 Rothia holli
 Rothia hypopyrrha
 Rothia lasti Kiriakoff, 1974
 Rothia lutescens
 Rothia martha
 Rothia metagrius
 Rothia micropales
 Rothia nigrescens
 Rothia nigrifimbriata
 Rothia pales
 Rothia panganica
 Rothia pedasus
 Rothia powelli
 Rothia rhaeo (Druce, 1894)
 Rothia rhaeoides  Kiriakoff, 1974
 Rothia simyra
 Rothia sinefasciata
 Rothia tenuis
 Rothia tranquilla
 Rothia tricolora
 Rothia turlini
 Rothia vaovao
 Rothia viossati
 Rothia virguncula
 Rothia watersi
 Rothia westwoodii Butler, 1879
 Rothia zea

References
Natural History Museum Lepidoptera genus database

Agaristinae